Ulmen Castle is a ruined castle complex in Ulmen, Germany.

The upper castle was built on a slope above the Ulmener Maar, while the lower castle was adjacent but below it.

References 

Castles in Germany